Senator Cross may refer to:

Burton M. Cross (1902–1998), Maine State Senate
Joseph Cross (judge) (1843–1913), New Jersey State Senate